Marian Curyło is a Polish politician. Member of Polish Parliament (Sejm) from Tarnów district from 2001 - 2005 for Self Defence party (Samoobrona).

Born in Tarnów in 1955, small businessman until voted to parliament He left Samoobrona in 2005 and joined Samoobrona Ruch Społeczny, later to become the Polish Labour Party (PPP).

References

Living people
1955 births
Members of the Polish Sejm 2001–2005
Self-Defence of the Republic of Poland politicians